Oleksandr Komarov (born 10 June 1988) is a Ukrainian Paralympic swimmer. He represented Ukraine at the Summer Paralympics in 2012, 2016 and 2021 and he won two medals at the 2016 Summer Paralympics: the gold medal in the men's 4 × 100 m freestyle relay 34pts event and the bronze medal in the 100 m freestyle S6 event.

At the 2019 World Para Swimming Championships held in London, United Kingdom, he won the bronze medal in the men's 100m freestyle S6 event.

References

External links 
 

1988 births
Living people
Place of birth missing (living people)
Ukrainian male freestyle swimmers
Paralympic swimmers of Ukraine
Paralympic gold medalists for Ukraine
Paralympic bronze medalists for Ukraine
Paralympic medalists in swimming
Swimmers at the 2012 Summer Paralympics
Swimmers at the 2016 Summer Paralympics
Swimmers at the 2020 Summer Paralympics
Medalists at the 2016 Summer Paralympics
Medalists at the World Para Swimming Championships
Medalists at the World Para Swimming European Championships
S6-classified Paralympic swimmers
21st-century Ukrainian people